The Eagle Vision is a full-sized, front-wheel drive four-door sports sedan produced from 1992 until 1997. It was marketed by Eagle, replacing the AMC/Renault-designed Eagle Premier (from which the Vision was derived). The Eagle Vision was badged as the Chrysler Vision in Europe. The Vision debuted at the 1992 North American International Auto Show in Detroit. As one of the LH sedans, it was Automobile Magazine's Automobile of the Year in 1993, and ultimately the only Eagle model to be completely designed and built in-house by Chrysler.

Design background

The Vision's design can be traced to 1986, when Chrysler designer Kevin Verduyn completed the initial exterior design of a new aerodynamic concept sedan called Navajo. The design never passed the clay model stage.

It was also at this time that the Chrysler Corporation purchased bankrupt Italian sports car manufacturer Lamborghini. The Navajo's exterior design was reworked and became the Lamborghini Portofino, released as a concept at the 1987 Frankfurt Auto Show. The Portofino was heralded as a design triumph, setting in motion Chrysler's decision to produce a production sedan with the Portofino's revolutionary exterior design, called "cab forward”.

This design was characterized by the long, low-slung windshield, and relatively short overhangs. The wheels were effectively pushed to the corners of the car, creating a larger passenger cabin compared to contemporary vehicles in its class.

Design of the chassis began in the late 1980s, after Chrysler had bought another automaker: American Motors Corporation (AMC) in 1987, from which the Eagle division is derived. During this time, Chrysler began designing the replacement for the Dodge Dynasty and Chrysler Fifth Avenue as well as a potential Plymouth. The initial design of Dodge's LH bore resemblance to the Dynasty, and this design was scrapped entirely after François Castaing, formerly AMC's Vice President of product engineering and development, became Chrysler's Vice President of vehicle engineering in 1988. The new design, under Castaing's leadership, began with the Eagle Premier.

The chassis design was continually refined throughout the following years, as it underpinned more Chrysler concepts: the 1989 Chrysler Millennium and 1990 Eagle Optima. The Premier's longitudinal engine mounting layout was inherited, as was the front suspension geometry, and parts of the braking system. The chassis itself became a flexible architecture capable of supporting front or rear-wheel drive (designated "LH" and "LX" respectively). The transmission was inspired by the Premier's Audi and ZF automatics. Borrowing heavily from Chrysler's A604 (41TE) "Ultradrive" transversely mounted automatic, it became the A606 (also known as 42LE).

By 1990, it was decided that the new technologically advanced car would need a new technologically advanced engine to power it. Until that time, the only engine confirmed for use was Chrysler's 3.3 L pushrod V6. The 3.3 L engine's 60° block was bored out to 3.5 L, while the pushrod-actuated valves were replaced with SOHC cylinder heads with four valves per cylinder, creating an advanced 3.5 L V6.

The appearance, still based on the cab forward exterior design of the 1987 Lamborghini Portofino concept, with its aerodynamic shape, made for little wind noise inside this large car. The engineering and sleek styling gives the Vision a low drag coefficient (0.31), on par with the Porsche 997.

Without badges, the Vision could easily pass as a (first-generation) Concorde. The main difference between the two are the taillight clusters. Like the European sedans it was marketed to compete against, the Vision incorporates rear amber turn signals over the Concorde's red ones. Neither does the Vision have the Concorde's faux rear lightbar between the taillights. While the two cars share headlights, the Vision's grille is smaller and, separated by its prominent center badge, has been likened to the appearance of "nostrils." The interior of the Vision is nearly identical to the Concorde, the biggest difference being the absence of the Concorde's faux wood trim and steering wheel emblem. Unlike the Vision, the Concorde never offered the AutoStick option. Marketed as a sports sedan, the Vision offered only bucket seats with a console, never the split bench with column shift.

The Vision featured a monochromatic design inside and out, with no brand or model badge on the doors (as found on the Concorde), and available aluminum wheels with a simple design. The single color motif was more pronounced on models without the grey lower body trim paint scheme. In keeping with its high-performance image, the Vision was the only LH sedan to come standard with "touring" suspension. "Performance" suspension was an available option on the Vision.

The upscale TSi model featured leather-trimmed seats, 8-way power seats for both the driver and front passenger, leather-wrapped steering wheel, leather shift knob, cloth door inserts, rear seat vents, center rear armrest, and personal reading lamps.

Power windows and central door locks were standard for both trims, as were dual airbags, with remote keyless entry available as an option. Among other factory-installed sound systems available, was the top-of-the-line Infinity sound system which included 8 speakers positioned throughout the cabin along with an equalizer. Head units included a radio with either cassette or CD playback and a maximum five-band adjustable graphic equalizer.

The TSi model was distinguishable as it did not have a fixed mast antenna, but a retractable power antenna that stored itself inside the rear passenger-side fender. Anti-lock brakes (ABS) were standard, with traction control optional.

Dual-way power sunroofs were available on this car in either trim. They were designed and installed by American Sunroof Corp. (now ASC Global) from its Columbus, Ohio plant, not by Mopar itself.  An installed sunroof eliminated most of the front overhead console that featured storage bins for a garage door opener and sunglasses. However, the Overhead Travel Information System (OTIS), an onboard computer with integrated map lights, was retained.

The Vision was generally the middle offering of the original three LH cars, with the ESi starting between a base Intrepid and a base Concorde (usually just under the Concorde by a few hundred dollars). However, the TSi's base price was more than a base Concorde. Other LH cars, the New Yorker and LHS, started higher than the Vision.

Trims
ESi - 1993–1997
TSi - 1993–1997

Drivetrains
For 1996, it lost , but gained 9 ft·lbf of torque.

Both engines included a 4-speed automatic transmission. The 1996 and 1997 TSi with its 3.5 had the 4-speed AutoStick option featuring a unique PRNDL mechanism invented by Peter Gruich.

3.3 L V6 – Horsepower and Torque:  &  (1992–93),  &  (1994–1995) and,  &  (1996–1997)
3.5 L V6 –  & 
The 3.3 L engine was engineered to run on 87 octane gasoline, while the larger 3.5 requires mid-grade 89 octane fuel as a minimum, but benefits from premium 91 octane fuel.

Year-to-year changes
1994: Variable-assist power steering was available, providing more feel at higher speeds. Both models now wore the same lower-body cladding, minimizing the evident differences between the ESi and TSi. The 3.3 L engine's power output was increased by 8 hp, while the 4-speed automatic transmission was revised for smoother shifting.
1995: New standard features included heated power exterior rear-view mirrors, power windows, and an AM/FM stereo with a cassette player. The 3.5  engine became available as an upgrade option for the ESi trim level.
1996: A new Autostick shifting feature became available for the TSi trim. The car could be "manually" shifted by tilting the shift knob right or left to change gears up or down. Plastic lower trim was deleted in favor of body color lower trim for a monochromatic color scheme. The Pentastar logo previously present on the front fenders in front of the doors was deleted. Windshield wiper jets were moved from the wiper arms to the hood. All 1996 Eagle Visions were made OBD-II compliant.
1997: Only minor changes were made to the 1997 Vision. After this model year, the Vision was discontinued.

Discontinuation
The Vision sold around 105,000 units, from 1993 to 1997, and Chrysler was planning to continue it to redesign the LH cars for 1998. Some prototypes featured the Eagle logo, and Vision production continued into September 1997 to offer dealers an adequate amount of 1997 models, until the introduction redesigned 1998 Vision. However, Chrysler made the decision to stop production of the Vision and Talon (Eagle's only other model by then) with the last unit built on September 5, 1997. On September 29, 1997, the automaker notified 2,340 U.S. and 337 Canadian dealers that the Eagle brand would be discontinued by the end of the 1998 model year.

The car that was planned to be the redesigned Vision, became the 1999 model year Chrysler 300M. It was released a year after the other redesigned LH cars in 1998.

Production Figures:

Awards
 1993: Automobile Magazine Automobile of the Year in 1993
 1994: Car and Driver's Ten Best List

Nameplate use 
In Mexico, the 2015 model of the Fiat Siena has been marketed as the Dodge Vision.

References

External links

 
 
 
 

Vision
Front-wheel-drive vehicles
Full-size vehicles
Sports sedans
Luxury vehicles
Police vehicles
Cars introduced in 1992